Throne is an unincorporated community in central Alberta within the County of Paintearth No. 18, located on Highway 12,  southeast of Camrose, and  southeast of Coronation, Alberta.

Localities in the County of Paintearth No. 18